William Pringle (21 January 1881 – 27 October 1966) was a South African cricketer. He played in two first-class matches for Border in 1902–03.

See also
 List of Border representative cricketers

References

External links
 

1881 births
1966 deaths
South African cricketers
Border cricketers